For Sentimental Reasons is a 1955 studio album by Ella Fitzgerald, issued on the Decca Records label. The album features tracks recorded during the late 1940s and early 1950s, that had been previously issued on 78rpm single.

Track listing
Side one:
"(I Love You) For Sentimental Reasons"  (William Best, Deek Watson) - 3:13 
"Guilty" (Richard A. Whiting, Harry Akst, Gus Kahn) - 3:14 
"It's Too Soon to Know" (Deborah Chessler) - 2:36 
"Baby Doll" (Johnny Mercer, Harry Warren) - 3:18 
"Mixed Emotions" (Stuart F. Louchheim) - 3:18 
"That Old Feeling" (Sammy Fain, Lew Brown) - 2:28 
Side two:
"Confessin'" (Al Neiburg, Doc Daugherty) - 3:24 
"A Sunday Kind of Love" (Barbara Belle, Anita Leonard, Stan Rhodes, Louis Prima) - 3:23 
"There Never Was a Baby Like My Baby" (Adolph Green, Betty Comden, Jule Styne) - 2:49 
"Walking by the River" (Una Mae Carlisle, Robert Sour) - 2:28 
"Because of Rain" (Nat King Cole, William Harrington, Ruth Pole) - 3:12 
"Don't You Think I Ought to Know" (William Johnson, Melvin Wettergreen) - 3:08

Personnel
Ella Fitzgerald - vocals
The Delta Rhythm Boys - Track 1. (Recorded in 1946)
Eddie Heywood and His Orchestra - Track 2. (Recorded in 1947)
Sonny Burke and His Orchestra - Track 4. (Recorded in 1951)
Sy Oliver and His Orchestra - Tracks 5. (Recorded 1951) 
The Day Dreamers (vocal harmony) - Track 6. (Recorded 1947)
Johnny Long and His Orchestra - Track 7. (Recorded in 1944)
Leroy Kirkland and His Orchestra - Track 10. (Recorded in 1952)
Bob Haggart and His Orchestra - Tracks 8 and 12. (Recorded in 1947)

References

1955 albums
Ella Fitzgerald albums
Decca Records albums